
Year 591 (DXCI) was a common year starting on Monday (link will display the full calendar) of the Julian calendar. The denomination 591 for this year has been used since the early medieval period, when the Anno Domini calendar era became the prevalent method in Europe for naming years.

Events 
 By place 

 Byzantine Empire 
 Byzantine–Sassanid War: Emperor Maurice, seeing an opportunity to end the prolonged war to the advantage of Constantinople, assists Khosrau II to regain the Persian throne. He sends a Byzantine army (35,000 men) under Narses into Mesopotamia, through Syria. At the same time, an expeditionary force in Armenia advances through Caucasian Iberia into Media (modern Azerbaijan). 
 Battle of Blarathon: A Persian army of about 40,000 men under King Bahrām VI is defeated, in the lowlands near Ganzak (northwestern Iran), by the Byzantines. Bahrām flees to seek refuge with the Turks in Central Asia, and settles in Fergana. However, after some time, he is murdered by a hired assassin of Khosrau II.
 Summer – Maurice begins a series of military expeditions, to defend the Balkan provinces from the Avars and Slavs. He establishes the Danube frontier (Limes Moesiae) from the Delta to the fortress city of Singidunum (Belgrade), and permits the Byzantines to reassert their authority in the interior.

 Europe 
 Agilulf, cousin of Authari (called "the Thuringian"), is raised on the shield (a ceremonial investment) by Lombard warriors in Milan. He becomes king of the Lombards, on advice of the Lombard dukes (dux). Agilulf marries widowed queen Theodelinda and is baptized to please her.
 Arechis I succeeds his uncle Zotto as the second  Duke of Benevento.
 A locust swarm destroys the harvest in Northern Italy (approximate date).

 Persia 
 Khosrau II is reinstalled as king of the Persian Empire. Peace with Constantinople is concluded after a war of almost 20 years. Maurice receives the Persian provinces of Armenia and Georgia. The recognition of the traditional frontiers, and the cessation of subsidies for the Caucasus forts, leaves the Byzantines in a dominant position in their relations with Persia.

 Asia 
 The first city wall of Hangzhou (Eastern China) is constructed.

 Mesoamerica 
 May 21 – A Mesoamerican ballgame court is dedicated at the Mayan city of Chinkultic (Mexico).

 By topic 

 Religion 
 Pope Gregory I criticizes the bishops of Arles and Marseille for allowing the forced baptism of Jews in Provence (France).
 Jnanagupta, Afghan Buddhist monk, translates the Vimalakirti Sutra into Chinese.

Births 
 Cadwallon ap Cadfan, king of Gwynedd (approximate date)
 Gundeberga, queen of the Lombards
 Li Xiaogong, prince of the Tang Dynasty (d. 640)
 Su Dingfang, general of the Tang Dynasty (d. 667)

Deaths 
 Aredius, abbot and saint 
 Faroald I, duke of Spoleto (or 592)
 Garibald I, duke of Bavaria (b. 540)
 Golindouch, Persian saint
 John Mystacon, Byzantine general (approximate date)
 Peter III of Raqqa, Patriarch of Antioch
 Li Delin, Chinese official and writer (b. 531)
 Yan Zhitui, Chinese scholar and official (b. 531)
 Zotto, founder of the Duchy of Benevento

References